Pende may refer to:

 Pendé a town in France
 The Pende people, an ethnic group in Congo
 Pendé River, river in Africa
 Nicola Pende (1880–1970), Italian endocrinologist